Autographa pulchrina (beautiful golden Y) is a moth of the family Noctuoidea. It is found in Europe East to the Urals and the Caucasus.Also in the Khentii Mountains (Mongolia) and East Siberia.

Description

The wingspan is 35–40 mm. The length of the forewings is 17–20 mm. Forewing fuscous purplish, with the dark suffusion
stronger than in iota; inner and outer lines more or less marked with pale yellowish, edged with dark brown;the inner preceded by a brown fascia; median area below middle ferruginous brown, with an orange suffusion beneath externally; reniform stigma partly outlined with pale golden; the two golden spots as in iota; submarginal line suffusedly edged with olive brown, except above anal angle; hindwing as in iota; in the ab. percontatrix Auriv. the two golden spots are confluent; the form gammoides Speyer, from the Baltic provinces and North and Central Germany, is darker, with the purplish tint of forewings stronger and the metallic spots united; — buraetica Stgr. is also a darker, brownish grey form, with stronger golden tinge and conjoined spots, from the Kentei Mts. and E. Siberia; in the ab. pallida ab. nov. [Warren] from the Engadine the ground colour is whitish.

The caterpillars are green and have yellowish white, slightly wavy lateral stripes. The head is green and blackish bordered. The pupa is black.

Biology
The moth flies in one or two generations in from May to June and August to September in case of a second generation.

The larvae feed on low plants such as nettle, honeysuckle, Stachys sylvatica and Jacobaea vulgaris.

Notes
The flight season refers to Belgium and The Netherlands. This may vary in other parts of the range.

References

External links

Beautiful golden Y at UKmoths
Funet Taxonomy
Fauna Europaea
Lepiforum.de
Vlindernet.nl 
waarneming.nl 

Plusiini
Moths of Europe
Moths of Asia
Taxa named by Adrian Hardy Haworth
Moths described in 1809